2,4,7-trihydroxy-1,4-benzoxazin-3-one-glucoside 7-O-methyltransferase (BX7 (gene), OMT BX7) is an enzyme with systematic name S-adenosyl-L-methionine:(2R)-4,7-dihydroxy-3-oxo-3,4-dihydro-2H-1,4-benzoxazin-2-yl β-D-glucopyranoside 7-O-methyltransferase. This enzyme catalyses the following chemical reaction

 S-adenosyl-L-methionine + (2R)-4,7-dihydroxy-3-oxo-3,4-dihydro-2H-1,4-benzoxazin-2-yl β-D-glucopyranoside  S-adenosyl-L-homocysteine + (2R)-4-hydroxy-7-methoxy-3-oxo-3,4-dihydro-2H-1,4-benzoxazin-2-yl β-D-glucopyranoside

The enzyme is involved in the biosynthesis of the protective and allelopathic benzoxazinoid DIMBOA, e.g. from the family Poaceae (grasses).

References

External links 
 

EC 2.1.1